Tocainide (Tonocard) is a class Ib antiarrhythmic agent. It is no longer sold in the United States.

Pharmacokinetics

Tocainide is a lidocaine analog, that does not have significant 1st pass metabolism.  It is found in two enantiomers.  The R isomer is 4x as potent as the S.  Oral bioavailability is 0.9-1.0. In the blood tocainide is 10-20% protein bound. The Volume of distribution is 2.5-3.5 L/kg.  30-50% is excreted unchanged in the urine.  The more active R-isomer is cleared faster in anephric patients or those with severe renal dysfunction.  The main metabolite is the glucuronidated tocainide carbamic acid.  The glucuronosyl transferase is apparently induced by rifampin.  Weak inhibition of Cyp1A2 leads to a mild theophylline interaction. (Not verbatim)

Synthesis

References

Further reading

External links

Antiarrhythmic agents
Sodium channel blockers
Anilides